Kim Song-hui (born 23 February 1987) is a North Korean female footballer, who plays as a striker for Pyongyang Sports Club in the Women's DPR Korea League.

Kim was selected for the North Korea women's national team, participating in the 2012 Summer Olympics and scored their two opening goals of the tournament on 25 July 2012, in a 2–0 win at Hampden Park, Glasgow against Colombia.

International goals

References

External links
 
 
 

1987 births
Living people
Sportspeople from Pyongyang
North Korean women's footballers
Olympic footballers of North Korea
Footballers at the 2012 Summer Olympics
Pyongyang Sports Club players
North Korea women's international footballers
Women's association football forwards